Spencer Township is one of nine townships in Boyd County, Nebraska, United States. The population was 758 at the 2000 census. A 2006 estimate placed the township's population at 682.

The village of Spencer lies within the township.

See also
County government in Nebraska

References

External links
City-Data.com

Townships in Boyd County, Nebraska
Townships in Nebraska